Sodium-coupled monocarboxylate transporter 1 is a protein that in humans is encoded by the SLC5A8 gene.

See also
 Solute carrier family

References

Further reading

Solute carrier family